Tangjiatuo Station is a station on Line 4 of Chongqing Rail Transit in Chongqing municipality, China, which opened in 2018. It is located in Jiangbei District.

References

Railway stations in Chongqing
Railway stations in China opened in 2018
Chongqing Rail Transit stations